Gary Francis Quinlan  (born 11 March 1951) is an Australian diplomat and public servant, who served as the Australian Ambassador to Indonesia from 2018 to 2021. He has previously served as High Commissioner to Singapore and as the Permanent Representative of Australia to the United Nations, including two terms as President of the United Nations Security Council.

Early life
Born on 9 February 1951, Quinlan was educated at the University of Newcastle and graduated in 1972 with a Bachelor of Arts degree in history with honours.

Diplomatic career
Quinlan joined the then Department of Foreign Affairs in 1973 and served in several senior positions in the Department in Canberra including First Assistant Secretary, Consular, Public Diplomacy and Parliamentary Affairs Division (2007) and First Assistant Secretary, Americas and Europe Division (2000–01). He was Head of the Australian Delegation to the Law of the Sea Preparatory Commission from 1987 until 1988.

Quinlan's overseas assignments have been as Second Secretary in Dublin (1974–77), First Secretary, Australian Mission to the United Nations, New York (1981–85), Australian Deputy Permanent Delegate to UNESCO, Paris (1979–81) and was attached to the Economic Development Institute, World Bank in Washington D.C. (1984). Quinlan served as Chief of Staff to the Minister for Trade (1993–94) and Minister for Industry, Science and Technology (1994–96), Peter Cook, and more recently served as Deputy Head of Mission, Australian Embassy Washington DC (2005–07) and High Commissioner to Singapore (2001–05).

From 2007, until his appointment as Ambassador and Permanent Representative to the United Nations in 2009, Quinlan was the Senior Advisor to the Prime Minister on Foreign Affairs, Defence, and National Security.

Following his return from the United Nations in New York in 2014, Quinlan became Deputy Secretary of the Department of Foreign Affairs and Trade and was tasked with the role of Australia's chief negotiator with Timor-Leste  over the East Timor maritime boundary dispute. The two parties reached an amicable agreement in February 2018, immediately before Quinlan was appointed as Australia's Ambassador to Indonesia.

Honours
Quinlan holds the honorary degree of Doctor of Letters (Hon DLitt, 2007) from the University of Newcastle. In the 2016 Queen's Birthday Honours he was made an Officer of the Order of Australia (AO) for "distinguished service to public administration in the field of international relations as a senior diplomat and ambassador, and as an advisor to government on foreign policy."

References

External links

Living people
1951 births
Permanent Representatives of Australia to the United Nations
University of Newcastle (Australia) alumni
High Commissioners of Australia to Singapore
Ambassadors of Australia to Indonesia
Australian diplomats
Officers of the Order of Australia